De Historia Piscium, (Latin for 'Of the History of Fish') is a scientific book written by Francis Willughby and published by the Royal Society in 1686. It was unpopular and sold poorly, causing severe strain on the finances of the society. This resulted in the society being unable to meet its promise to finance the publication of Newton's Philosophiae Naturalis Principia Mathematica ("Mathematical Principles of Natural Philosophy", better known simply as Principia), leaving this to Edmond Halley, who was then the clerk of the society. After Halley had personally financed the publication of Principia, he was informed that the society could no longer afford to provide him the promised annual salary of £50. Instead, the similarly wealthy Halley was paid with left-over copies of De Historia Piscium.

External links
 Scanned images of De Historia Piscium first edition

Notes

Science books
1686 books